The Nurse may refer to:

Nurse (Romeo and Juliet), a character in William Shakespeare's Romeo and Juliet
"The Nurse", a song by The White Stripes from their 2005 album Get Behind Me Satan
The Nurse (1912 film)
The Nurse, a 1997 American drama horror thriller film starring Lisa Zane
The Nurse (2017 film), a 2-minute short film, related to The Conjuring film series
The Nurses (TV series), a 1960s American serialized medical drama